Vaccinium hirsutum is a species of flowering plant in the heath family known by the common name hairy blueberry. This species is endemic to a small area in the southern Appalachian mountains, where it is only known from a few counties in eastern Tennessee, northern Georgia, and the Carolinas.

Vaccinium hirsutum is native to dry oak-pine ridges, where it can be locally abundant. It is a shrub up to 75 cm (28 inches) tall, forming large colonies. Leaves are rather thick, elliptical, densely hairy, up to 62 mm (2 1/2 inches) long.

Vaccinium hirsutum produces white, cylindrical flowers in late spring, followed by hairy, black berries in the summer.

References

hirsutum
Flora of the Southeastern United States
Plants described in 1843
Blueberries